Patrick Lolo (born April 25, 1980 in Makotimpoko) is a Congolese football striker currently playing for Diables Noirs. He is a member of the Congo national football team.

International career

International goals
Scores and results list Congo's goal tally first.

References

External links 

1980 births
Living people
Republic of the Congo footballers
Association football forwards
AS Mangasport players
Expatriate footballers in Gabon
Republic of the Congo expatriate footballers
Republic of the Congo international footballers